The Tongue River (Texas) is a river in Texas.

See also
List of rivers of Texas

References

External links

Rivers of Texas
Tributaries of the Red River of the South